Koger may refer to:

People with the surname
Alan Koger (born 1987), American soccer player
Ann Koger (born 1950), American tennis coach
Dániel Kóger (born 1989), Hungarian ice hockey player
Gregory Koger (born 1970s), American political scientist
Kevin Koger (born 1989), American football player
Liis Koger (born 1989), Estonian painter and poet

Places
Koger Center for the Arts, arts center in South Carolina, U.S.
William Koger House (Smithsonia, Alabama), historic house in Alabama, U.S.
William Koger House (Waxahachie, Texas), historic house in Texas, U.S.